Slankamenački Vinogradi (Slovak: Slankamenské Vinohrady) is a village in Serbia. It is situated in the Inđija municipality, in the Srem District, Vojvodina province. The village has a Slovak ethnic majority and its population numbering 266 people (2002 census).

Name
The name of the village in Serbian is plural.

Cultural manifestations 
 Pudarski dani

See also
List of places in Serbia
List of cities, towns and villages in Vojvodina

 

Populated places in Syrmia
Slovaks of Vojvodina